Old Noarlunga (formerly Noarlunga) is a suburb in the Australian state of South Australia located about  south of the state capital of Adelaide. Originally settled around 1840, the town retains its village atmosphere in spite of encroaching suburbia.

Etymology
 
Contemporary Australian linguists believe the name 'Noarlunga' is derived from the Kaurna nurlo (corner/curve/bend) + ngga (place).

History
In the early years of settlement, the surrounding area was cleared for wheat farming, and a flour mill was built in the town in 1843 along with wharves used to transport produce down the Onkaparinga River to Port Noarlunga via barge. The town still has a stone bridge across the Onkaparinga, making the town a focal point for travel further down the coast.

In 1846, the Hundred of Noarlunga land division was proclaimed, extending along the coast from the Sturt River to Onkaparinga, but named after the indigenous term nurlo (curve) for the horse-shoe bend of the Onkaparinga.

In 1850 the South Australia Company laid out the 'No-orlunga Township' at the 'Horseshoe', Onkaparinga River. 1856 saw the formation of the District Council of Noarlunga following residents on either side of the Onkaparinga. The new council was formed by excision of parts of both the District of Morphett Vale on the north bank and District Council of Willunga on the south bank.

By the 1860s the town had a post office, a council chamber, two churches, a public pound, two hotels, a mill, a brewery and a brickworks.

Old Noarlunga became a well known sporting venue, visited by cycling clubs and throughout the 20th century the town was a popular stopping point for tourists on the way to beaches in the region.

1972 saw Main South Road bypass the town and in 1978, by council resolution it became Old Noarlunga. Many local residents at the time were not in favour of the townships name change.

See also
Noarlunga (disambiguation)

External links
  (map) "Plan of Noarlunga on the Onkaparinga River, with street names, allotment numbers and areas designated for a market, chapel, government and school reserves. (The township was from 1978 onwards known as Old Noarlunga.) ..."

Notes

Towns in South Australia